Vidyapeeth Highschool Kolhapur is a Marathi school located in Kolhapur, Maharashtra, India. Vidyapeeth has the merit of having many students in the State Merit List year after year. The school was started in 1917 by Shri. Tophkhane-guruji on a land donated by the King of Kolhapur Chhatrapati Shahu Maharaj. The land that was previously used as his stable. Since then the school has produced many notable alumni in different fields. The school is located next to Mahalaxmi Temple in Kolhapur and also has a land outside the city in Tapovan. Rana Thakur Yeshwantsinh (Yeshwant) Kelavkar was appointed by Late Sh. Ch. Shahu Maharaj of Kolhapur as the first founding Principal and therefore in his remembrance and for his outstanding contributions to the development of the school; 19 January is celebrated as Kelavkar Din (Day) every year.

References

Education in Kolhapur
1917 establishments in India
Educational institutions established in 1917